Sir William Lytton DL JP (29 September 1586 – 14 August 1660) was an English politician who sat in the House of Commons  from 1640 to 1648.  He supported the Parliamentary cause in the English Civil War.

Early life

Lytton was born on 29 September 1586. He was the eldest son of Sir Rowland Lytton of Knebworth, and Anne ( St John) Corbert. Before his parent's marriage, his mother was the widow of Robert Corbet, MP for Shropshire.

His paternal grandparents were Rowland Lytton, Governor of the Castle of Boulogne, and the former Anne Carleton (a daughter of George Carleton and sister to George Carleton). His maternal grandfather was Oliver St John, 1st Baron St John of Bletso and, his first wife, Agnes Fisher. After his grandmother's death, his grandfather married Elizabeth Chamber, a lady-in-waiting to each of King Henry VIII's six wives.

He was educated at Westminster school from 1601 to 1602, and Emmanuel College, Cambridge from 1603 to 1607 before travelling abroad to France, Italy and the low countries from 1608 to 1609 with William Borlase and William Cecil.

Career
He succeeded his father in 1615, inheriting the Knebworth estate. He was knighted on 25 July 1624 and appointed High Sheriff of Hertfordshire in 1625 serving until 1626. He was Deputy Lieutenant of the county from 1625 to 1630.

In 1628, Lytton was elected Member of Parliament for Hertfordshire. In April 1640, he was re-elected MP for Herefordshire in the Short Parliament and then in November 1640 for the Long Parliament. Lytton supported the Parliamentary cause in the Civil War and was one of the commissioners sent by Parliament and received by King Charles who tried to negotiate peace at Oxford in 1643, (They failed to reach terms and the war was to continue for three more years). Lytton was excluded from parliament under Pride's Purge in 1648.

Personal life
On 24 February 1612, Lytton married firstly Anne Slaney, the only child of Stephen Slaney of Norton, Shropshire (son of Sir Stephen Slaney). Before her death in 1626, they were the parents of one son and seven daughters, including:

 Margaret Lytton (1613–1689), who married Thomas Hillersdon, of Elstow.
 Rowland Lytton (–1674), MP for Hertfordshire; he married Judith Edwards, daughter of Humphrey Edwards. After her death, he married Rebecca ( Chapman) Lucy, daughter of Thomas Chapman and widow of Sir Richard Lucy
 Mary Lytton (b. 1622), who married Sir Henry Anderson, 1st Baronet of Penley. After his death, she married Sir Edward Gostwick, 3rd Baronet in 1646.
 Dorothy Lytton (d. 1703), who married her cousin Sir John Barrington, 3rd Baronet, MP for Newtown.
 Jane Lytton, who married Sir Thomas Bosville.

Around November 1644 He married secondly Ruth ( Barrington) Lamplugh (d. 1645), daughter of Sir Francis Barrington, 1st Baronet of Barrington Hall, Essex and widow of Sir George Lamplugh of Kirby Sigston. 

On his death he was buried at Knebworth and succeeded by his son Rowland. A monument was not erected until 1705, this being to the design of Edward Stanton.

References

 

1586 births
1660 deaths
Alumni of Emmanuel College, Cambridge
English MPs 1628–1629
English MPs 1640 (April)
English MPs 1640–1648
High Sheriffs of Hertfordshire
Deputy Lieutenants of Hertfordshire
Burials at Knebworth
Knights Bachelor
Members of the Parliament of England for Hertfordshire